"Let's Hear It for the Boy" is a song by Deniece Williams that appeared on the soundtrack to the feature film Footloose. The song was released as a single from both the soundtrack and her album of the song's same name on February 14, 1984, by Columbia Records. It was written by Tom Snow and Dean Pitchford and produced by George Duke. The song became Williams' second number one on the US Billboard Hot 100 on May 26, 1984, also topping the dance and R&B charts, and peaked at number two on the UK Singles Chart, behind "Wake Me Up Before You Go-Go" by Wham!. It was nominated for an Academy Award for Best Original Song, and was certified platinum in the US and gold in Canada and the UK by the Recording Industry Association of America, Music Canada and the British Phonographic Industry, respectively. The music video was released in mid-April 1984. The song features background vocals from George Merrill and Shannon Rubicam, who would go on to form the duo Boy Meets Girl.

In 2011, country singer Jana Kramer covered the song for the remake of Footloose. In 2017 the song was covered by UK hi-NRG dance artist Allan Jay in aid of the Retired Greyhound Trust and their Let's Hear It for the Boy campaign.

Music video
The music video for the song features Williams along with several young men, one of them being the singer Aaron Lohr as the young boy who is the first person to appear in the video.

Credits and personnel
Tom Snow – composition
Dean Pitchford – composition
Deniece Williams – lead vocals, backing vocals
George Merrill – backing vocals
Shannon Rubicam – backing vocals
George Duke – producer, drum programming, keyboards, Memory Moog bass, Prophet synthesizer, synthesizer
Paul Jackson, Jr. – guitar
Paulinho Da Costa – percussion

Charts

Weekly charts

Year-end charts

Certifications

See also
 List of Billboard Hot 100 number-one singles of 1984

References

1984 singles
Deniece Williams songs
Billboard Hot 100 number-one singles
Cashbox number-one singles
RPM Top Singles number-one singles
Songs from Footloose
Songs written by Tom Snow
Songs written by Dean Pitchford
Freestyle music songs
1984 songs
Columbia Records singles
Dance-pop songs
Post-disco songs
Song recordings produced by George Duke